The Turtle Prince or The Tortoise Prince refers to a group of South Indian and Sri Lankan folktales wherein a prince in turtle form marries a human princess.

Summary

Natesa Sastri's tales

First version
In his translation of The Dravidian Nights Entertainment, Natesa Sastri translated two stories of the turtle (tortoise) prince. In the first one, titled Faith Is Always Rewarded, King Venkataja, from the city of Mallikârjunapurî, is married to a first wife who hasn't born him a son. So he divorces her, places the former queen in a separate pavilion next to the palace, and marries a second time. The new queen also does not bear him children. The King searches for illumination, and Mahêsvara and the Sûlapânin Isa help him by giving him a magical mango-fruit that shall help the new queen. The servants press the mango and prepare a juice for her to drink. As for the mango seed, the first queen's servant takes it and gives her. The queen breaks a portion of the seed and gives to her maid. The second queen gives birth to twin boys, the maid to a son and the first queen to a tortoise. The narrative says that the tortoise son was no ordinary turtle, but a beautiful prince born of Paramêsvara's favour. The first queen feeds the tortoise. One night, the tortoise moves toward his mother's plate of rice, takes off its shell and becomes a boy. He eats the rice and hides again under the tortoise shell. The mother notices the missing food and suspects the maidservant, but decides to investigate further: that night, she pretends to be asleep, and sees the tortoise moving towards the bowl of rice, taking off its shell and becoming a human boy. The queen smashes the shell. When the boy tries to find it, he sees the shell has been destroyed. He wakes his mother and explains that he needed the shell for some more time before he revealed himself truly. He then says he will paint himself with soot and charcoal and asks his mother to hide him in a box. Parmêsvara instructs sages to go to the city to teach the prince in the box.

Some time later, the king instructs his twin sons to go up north, to the furthest mountain,  ("the frosty mountain"), and get a princess as their father's third wife. He puts some more charcoal on his skin and accompanies the twin princes. They reach a red-coloured stream and think of drinking the water, but the prince knows that the stream was the left over water from the princess's bath. So he takes his two half-brothers, one on each arm, and leaps from one margin to the other. The princess sees the event, for she has declared she will marry the man who can cross the stream. The princess tells her father of the incident and to prepare her marriage to the extraordinary man. The man agrees, with the condition that he still wears the black soot on the ceremony. They marry, and the man reveals to his wife his royal origins, and advises her that she should come to Himayagiri should he not returns in 28 days' time.

The tortoise prince (in his disguise) and the twin princes continue their journey. In another city, a similar marriage test is imposed on the princess's potential suitor: a peon on the city entrance gives a pie for travellers and says they must find firewood, leaf and oil, and return the pie. The prince-as-black deduces the answer and gives the man a sesamum plant (stem for firewood, its leaves as leaves, and its seed for oil). The princess marries the black prince; the prince reveals his origins and tells her to go after him if he does not return after an appointed time.

The black prince succeeds and marries the third princess. They marry and he relates his story to her and the purpose of the journey. The princess tells him how to find the princess of Himayagiri: one should circulate and mountain, find the creeper, climb onto it and be taken to her presence, and prostrate before her and call her his mother.

The black prince goes to Himayagiri and sees that his two brothers have stopped at its base. The prince does as his third wife advised, meets the princess and explains the purpose of the visit. She decides to join him and his brothers and climb down the creeper. The princess says she forgot a golden scimitar up the mountain and the prince goes back. On that moment, his two brothers, jealous of his successes through their journey, cut the rope and he falls to his death.

The twin princes bring the maiden from Himayagiri to their father, but she tells her to postpone the wedding for six months, since she will make a penance. Meanwhile, the tortoise's three wives go to the place he dies and weep over his shattered body. The third wive, the learned woman, tells the other two to gather his remains for she knows of a way to revive him. The three wives pray and resurrect him. The quartet visits each kingdom, gets presents and dowries, and return in secret to his father's kingdom to meet the tortoise prince's mother.

After six months, the maiden from Himayagiri asks for a last item before her wedding: a golden lotus flower from the beyond the seven oceans, that only the tortoise prince can get - if he is still alive, that is. She mockingly tells her prospective husband-to-be that if his twin sons brought her back, surely they can fetch the flower.

The twin princes go to the ocean shore and remember their treachery towards their extraordinary companion. The black prince appears behind them and offers to get the flower, for he was instructed to do so by his third wife. He takes seven pebbles and uses each of them to drain the seven oceans; He then reaches the sacred waters called , chants a summon command, gives a Rakshasa a note from his third wife, jumps on a crocodile and gets the golden lotus.

The tortoise prince and the twin half-brothers deliver the flower to the maiden from Himayagiri. She finally consents to the wedding and asks the king to send invitations to all lords of the world, and to have the first  wife, his son and his three wives give her in marriage. The king visits his first wife and notices the three princesses, but decides to keep up appearances and feign knowledge of them. On the wedding day, where kings of all parts of the world are assembled, the maiden from Himayagiri tells them the story of the tortoise prince, his mother, his father and his journey. The guests want to hear the story from the mouth of the tortoise prince. The king embraces the tortoise prince as his son and marries the maiden from Himayagiri. The prince forgives his half-brothers' misgivings and they live peacefully.

Second version
In Sastri's second tale, titled True Merit Shall Be Rewarded, in the northern city of Amarâvati, king Alakiyasingarâja and his minister Subhamantrî are good friends, and promise each other to marry their children to each other, if they have them. Months later, the queen gives birth to a tortoise and the minister's wife to a daughter. Years pass and the king laments his lot of having a tortoise son. The tortoise prince talks to him and suggests they go through with the marriage promise. The minister cannot consent to the marriage because of the suitor's status as an animal, but his eldest daughter tells him that she made a vow to marry whoever brought her the parijata flower.

The tortoise prince wants his father to throw him in the ocean so he may begin his quest. The king does and the animal son swims the seven mighty oceans to reach Udayagiri, the mountain where the Sun rises every morning. He salutes the Sun-god, Sûrya-bhagavan, and his charioteer, Aruna, as they begin the daily journey. The Sun questions the tortoise as to the purpose of his presence. The tortoise prince says he was born as animal in this life, but chants 1,008 praises to the deity. The Sun-god tells him that his tortoise shape was a penance for a misdeed in a previous life and blesses him with the ability to assume a human state at will. As a last aid, the Sun-god directs the now human prince towards a nearby sage.

The prince meets the sage, who directs him to two other sages. The third sage tells him that in the temple, there is a garden with a lake, where the divine maidens (Apsaras) come to bathe. He should hide nearby and steal the clothes of one of them, escape to Ganêsa's temple, bolt the door and hold onto to it for enough time to convince the maiden to get the parijata flowers for him. It happens as described and the Apsara regains her dress and rejoins her sisters. In her divine realm, she commissions a  guitar from the divine carpenter, takes a basket full of parijata flowers and dishes and returns to the prince.

The divine maiden sets the dishes before them for a meal and explains that the guitar can summon her and the wonderful dishes he sees before him. The prince descends the temple the next day and enters the third sage's house. The third sage notices the magic guitar and wishes to trade it for a self-attacking club that can decimate armies. The prince parts with the guitar for the club. When he leaves, the club talks to him that its previous owner, the third sage, has not given him food for the last generation and wants to beat him. The prince agrees and the club kills the third sage. The same event happens to the other two sages: the second sage trades a magic purse for the guitar and the first a pair of teleporting sandals; the prince kills them with the club and retrieves the magic guitar.

He summons the divine maiden and has dinner with her one last time (for now). He explains that he will deliver the parijata flower to the minister's daughter and marry her, but he will give her the other magical objects for her to hide. He assumes the tortoise shape and swims back to his father's kingdom to present the minister's daughter with the flowers.

She receives the flowers and consents to a wedding date. The minister 's eldest daughter marries the tortoise prince, to her sadness, and her sisters normal husbands. One night, while his human wife is asleep, the prince crawls to the shore, to the place where the divine maiden hid the objects (a baniyan tree), and commands the club to take off his tortoise shell. He summons the maiden with the guitar and they have a splendid meal.

One day, his brothers-in-law decide to go hunting. The tortoise prince tells his wife to prepare a sword and a mount, for he will join them. So she does, despite expecting the mockery of the people. The tortoise prince rides his lame horse to the baniyan tree, takes off the tortoise shell and becomes a man. He wears the sandals and the club and spreads divine ashes over his body. HIs brothers-in-law see him and mistake him for a god himself, and dines with him. The prince pretends to bless the pair and asks for their little finger in return. Both men agree and cut off their fingers to give him. On a second hunt, the god-like prince demands their rings.

Some time later, an enemy army marches to conquer their city, and the tortoise prince is the only one that can help his brothers-in-law. He orders his wife to prepare a seven tubs of hot water when he returns. He rides as a tortoise, retreats someplace and returns as a human with the magic club to vanquish the enemy army, to their brothers-in-law' admiration. He dons the tortoise shell and returns to his wife.

He bids his wife to leave the room, takes off the tortoise shell and enters the bath. His wife, spying on the other side of the door, sees his human form and swoons. She wakes up and breaks the tortoise shell. After the prince exits the bath, he demands his tortoise shell back, but his wife explains she smashed it to pieces. The prince excuses her and drops onto the bed out of sheer exhaustion. The minister's daughter rushes to her parents to show them the true form of her husband. The king and queen also see their son's human form. The brothers-in-law recognize him as the god-like bring they met in the forest. The prince and the minister's daughter remarry and he assumes the throne.

Henry Parker's tales

First version
Author Henry Parker collected a homonymous tale from Ceylon titled  or The Turtle Prince. In this tale, two noblemen live in two houses in the same city. Their respective wives bear seven children each: one gives birth to seven daughters, and the other to six boys and a turtle. Both men decide to marry their children to each other, but there is the problem of the seventh couple: how can his daughter marry a turtle? The man relents and authorizes his daughter's marriage. Some time later, the king of the same city announces that whoever brings him the Fire Cock (or fire[-coloured] cock) from the Land of the Rakshasas shall receive the kingdom. The turtle prince asks his mother to go to the king and offer his services. The turtle prince cooks a bit of rice and goes on the journey. On the road, he hides behind some trees and takes off his "turtle jacket". He takes shelter with three old women in his quest for the "Jewelled Cock", but each warns him many have tried and failed. Since he insists on soldiering on, the widow-mothers teach him magic and give him magic objects to create obstacles for the Rakshasas, should they pursue him after he gets the bird. The prince gets the bird and use the magical items to hinder the pursuing Rakshasas. He goes back to the trees, puts the turtle jacket on and returns to the kingdom with the Fire Cock. Having succeeded, the turtle prince takes off his jacket and goes to hear the Bana with his wife. The wife, noticing the man is her husband, rushes home to burn the turtle jacket and keep her husband in human form definitively. Parker sourced this tale from a tom-tom beater in Hiriyala, North Western Province, Sri Lanka.

Second version
In another tale, The Prince who received the Turtle Shell, in a certain kingdom, the prince's preceptors notice that he fails to absorb their teachings and inform the king. His brothers also show to be more skilled than him, and he, dejected, abandons the kingdom. He takes shelter with a cow-herd and his wife. While he grazes he cows, a goddess shows compassion to him and gives him a turtle shell and a spell. With it, he can turn into a turtle and vice versa. He goes to another kingdom and becomes the adopted son to a flower-mother. He learns the seventh princess is still single and decides to court her in both human and turtle forms. The princess brings the turtle to her palace; he takes off his disguise and tells her his story. With time, she becomes pregnant and the king questions her about. She tells it is the flower-mother's son, so he delivers her to him and banishes her from the palace. Some time later, the king organizes a feast with a hunt, and sends six of his sons-in-law to take part in it. The seventh princess tells her husband and he joins the hunting party in ragged clothes. Out of sight, he changes into a prince, kills the animals, takes their tongues and goes back to his shaggy disguise. The brothers-in-law present the animals to the king, but the seventh prince shows up to take the credit for his deed and show him the tongues.

Third version
In another published tale, Concerning a Royal Princess and a Turtle, a king and a minister, due to their deep friendship and trust, promise to betrothe their first children to each other. The king's wife has a little girl, and the minister's wife gives birth to a turtle. The time comes for their wedding vows, but the princess refuses to marry the turtle son, but, if they insist on continuing with the marriage, she asks for the turtle to bring her a Sūriya-kāntā flower. The turtle goes to the place where the sun (Surya) rises, and puts his head to be crushed by the sun's chariot wheel. Surya gives the turtle the ability to change into a man by coming out of his turtle shell, and directs him to the trail of three Dēwatāwās. The Dēwatāwās point to him a hidden lake where "Virgin Women" (Kanniyā-Striyō) or Sun-maidens (Sūriyā-kāntāwō), and he must steal their clothing and force them to give him the flower. The youth gets the flower, and is also given a cudgel and a magic lute. He returns to the turtle shell and marries the princess, while her sisters marry human princes. One day, the six princes go on a seven-day hunt, and the turtle prince, still in turtle form, asks his wife to bring him a mount and a sword. He receives a mule and a short sword and joins his brothers-in-law on the hunt, but hides in the forest, takes off the turtle shell and summons the Virgin Women to give him a horse and a better sword. The prince, in human shape, hunts the best game for himself. After a while, he meets the six other princes and agrees to give them six dead deers, in exchange for a piece of cloth from each. The turtle prince changes back into a turtle and presents a dead rat as the catch of the day. This goes on for the next days: the prince exchanges his game for the princes' rings. When the seven day hunt ends, the turtle prince asks his wife to prepare a hot bath for him; the princess sees him coming out of the shell and burns it. At last, the prince, now fully human, presents himself to his father-in-law the proof that he was the one who hunted the best game for him.

Venkataswami's version
In a tale collected by author M. N. Venkataswami with the title The Nymph of Wire Hill, a king has two wives, but no sons. He goes to the forest and meets an anchorite who directs him to a mango tree. The king takes the mangoes and brings home to his wives. The younger wife eats the fruits, and leaves the mango peel and cots. The senior wife eats the mango kernels. Months later, the younger wife gives birth to twin sons and the senior wife to a tortoise.

The senior wife accepts her lot in life and cares for the tortoise as her son. One day, she and a servant notice that some food has been disappearing from their palace. It turns out that her tortoise son is indeed human, for he leaves the tortoise shell in human form, eat the food and go to Davendraloka to learn, just as his half-brothers are learning from a pandit. The senior wife discovers the empty shell, notices her son is human after all, and smashes it. Losing his turtle shell, he asks his mother to fashion him a box to cover himself with.

Some time later, the king becomes ill with longing for the "Nymph of the Wire Hill", and his sons decide to look for her as their father's next wife. The tortoise son, now human, tells his mother he must join his brothers, since they cannot get the Nymph. The senior wife applies some colirium to his face and his appearance darkens, so his brothers cannot recognize him.

He joins his brothers and they begin their quest. Their first stop is a kingdom whose princess declared she will marry the one who can jump across a large stream. The first princess tells her father she will marry the dark boy who accompanies the twin princes. He tells he is only an ascetic without much to his name. They marry and the prince spends some time with his wife, asking her how to get to Wire Hill. Before he departs, he gives her a Mangalasustram as token of life.

Their next stop is another kingdom, where a princess issued a challenge: who can bring her all the necessary provisions for life in a pie? The tortoise prince goes to the bazaar, buys a unit of all grains in a bundle, produces some ghi on a leaf and a faggot of wood. The second princess marries the man who brought the provisions, who are the correct answer to her riddle. Before he departs, he gives the princess a flower a token of life.

The princes' third stop is another kingdom, whose princess issued a proclamation to marry anyone who can decipher a drawing of the Devendraloka with some inscriptions underneath. The tortoise prince deciphers the drawing and the inscriptions and marries for the third time. While talking to his new wife, she tells him the on the southern part of Wire Hill there is a wire that he can use to reach the Nymph. Before he departs, he plants a lily as a token of life and instructs her to go to Wire Hill in case the flower blackens.

At last, the three princes arrive at Wire Hill. The twins prince complain to each other about their companion's marital successes and plan something against him. The tortoise prince climbs the wire and meets the Nymph. After spending some time with him, the Nymph climbs down the wire, but asks the youth to bring her her parrot cage. The tortoise prince descends the wire with the bird cage, but the twin princes cut the wire and he falls to his death.

Each of the princesses notice the token of life changes color, and run Wire Hill, the first princess meeting the second and both meeting the third one. The trio reach Wire Hill and see the tortoise prince's bones scattered about. They gather them all up. The youngest wife goes to a cistern, bathes seven times and enters a meditation state, extending the folds of her garments to receive something. Parwati heeds her lamentations and Parmeshwara gives her a rod to use on the tortoise prince to revive him. The youngest princess uses the rod on her husband and returns it to the cistern.

The tortoise prince, now revived, takes his three wives, passes by each of their kingdoms to gather presents and amass a large retinue, and return to his kingdom. He asks his three wives to meet and greet his mother, bathe her feet and offer her a seat.

Meanwhile, the twin princes get the credit for bringing the Nymph of Wire Hill to their father. Still thinking of the youth who came to her at Wire Hill, she tells her husband-to-be, the king, that before their wedding she needs some cobra-lillies, found only at the end of seven and seven fourteen seas, beyond the sea of milk. The tortoise prince notices his brothers are being sent for the cobra-lillies, and asks his third and youngest wife for advice. She gives him a letter and some seeds and explains what to do: he is to cast the seeds into the sea, which will open a dry passage for him; he is to walk all the way until he sees a turtle; he is to give the turtle the letter; the turtle will return and take him to its king, the Lord of Serpents.

The tortoise prince follows his third wife's instructions and finds the turtle, giving it the letter. The turtle takes the prince to the court of the Lord of Serpents, who greets him. He marries him to his daughter, the "celestial Swain", gives him some cobra-lillies and sends both his daughter and son-in-law back on the turtle. The twin princes arrive on the beach and see the tortoise prince and his new wife coming. The prince agrees to give them the cobra-lillies.

Seeing that the task is fulfilled, the Nymph of Wire Hill agrees to set a date for their marriage with the king and invites a grand assembly of nobles and monarchs. She notices, however, the absence of the senior wife and her son. The king takes issue with this information, since, to his mind, only his younger wife bore him any sons. The Nymph of Wire Hill scolds her fiancé and tells him that his twin sons did nothing heroice, but the tortoise prince. The king spits at the twin sons and banishes them, and embraces his senior wife and their son, the tortoise prince, and his four wives. Venkataswami classified the tale as a "Tortoise Prince Type".

Ramanujan's version
Indian scholar A. K. Ramanujan collected and published a tale from Kannada with the title The Turtle Prince. In this tale, a king and his minister have no children, so they consult a holy man, who tells them that if devote themselves to Siva, their wives will become pregnant. Hearing the good news, they agree to marry their scions to each other.

Some time passes and the queen gives birth to a turtle and the minister's wife to a daughter. Years pass and the king is worried about his agreement to the minister, since the animal prince cannot simply marry a human girl. The turtle prince tells his father to consult with the minister. The minister's daughter says she will marry the man who can bring her the celestial parijata flower.

The turtle begs his father to take him to water so he can begin the journey. The turtle prince swims to Udaya mountain, where he prays to the sun God. The deity himself appears before him, explains his animal shape is penance for a misdeed in a past life, and transforms him into a handsome prince.

He meets three sages on the way, the last of which directs him to the temple of the elephant-faced god and tells him that nearby celestial maidens come down to earth to bathe, and that he should steal the sari of one of them and return to the temple. He does and one of the celestial maidens begs for the sari back. The prince explains he wants the parijata flowers that grow on the celestial realm.

The celestial maiden goes back to her realm and back to the prince, bringing some flowers and giving a flute to summon her. The prince makes his way back to the sages, who each want the magic flute in exchange a gift they have: the first a wand that can beat one's enemies, the second a sack that grants the owner whatever they wish for, and the third a pair of teleporting sandals. The prince trades the flute for each and commands the wand to beat up the sage and retrieves the flute.

Now back to his kingdom, he hides the magical items and prays to the Sun God to become a turtle again. He presents the girl with the flowers and asks or the marriage to be set. The minister arranges a grand ceremony to marry his eldest daughter to the turtle, and his two other daughter to human princes.

Some time later, the princes want to go on a hunt, and the tortoise decides to join them. His wife is aware of the mocking comments they already suffer, but relents and prepares him. On the way, the turtle takes off its shell, becomes human. Fierce tigers frighten the hunting party, but are no match for the prince. The brothers-in-law meet the prince ("they saw the turtle"), who agrees to give them the dead tigers in exchange for the left half of their mustaches. The men agree and everyone returns, the prince back to turtle form.

Later that night, while the minister's daughter is asleep, the prince takes off his shell, undresses his wife, caresses her body and goes back to being a turtle. The next morning, she notices that someone came in the night, and decides to investigate. The next night, his wife discovers his human form and wants his charade to end. The next morning, the brothers-in-law go to court to take the credit for killing the tigers, but the turtle appears, takes off the shell and becomes a man. He reveals he is the one responsible for the deed and shows the mustaches as proof. He then is crowned the king.

Other publications
Author Zacharias P. Thundy published a tale from Kadar that he titled Beauty and the Beast: a turtle is born to a king and, before he marries the minister's daughter, is sent on a quest for the parijata flower.

Scholar Stuart Blackburn collected a Tamil tale he titled The Turtle Prince: a raja and a minister promise to marry their children. When a turle is born to the raja and six girls to the minister, the eldest daughter asks for her turtle suitor to get her a parijatarn flower. The turtle prince goes to Sun god Surya, who grants him a boon: he can transform into human form and hold the turtle shell in his hand. With the directions of an ascetic, he steals the garments of a Kannimar to convince her to get him the flower. The Kannimar gives him a vina in cas he wants to summons her help anywhere. He also obtains a magic wand (baton) a magic bag and magic sandals. He returns as a turtle to his bride, the minister's eldest daughter, and marries her. One day, he asks for a blind helper and a lame horse as mount to join his brothers-in-law in the hunt. Later, he defends his father's kingdom against a foreign army, and, when he goes home to bathe, his wife takes the turtle shell and burns it.

Analysis
According to scholarship, the Tortoise Prince appears in Tamil folklore. In a version of the tale, he is born after his mother swallows the pit of a mango.

One of the earliest versions of the story seems to have been compiled in the  work Madanakamaraja Katha.

Professor Stuart Blackburn related the South Indian tales about "The Turtle Prince" to the cycle of stories known internationally as Animal as Bridegroom: tales where human princesses are married to husbands in animal form.

Variants
Blackburn collected at least 18 variants of the story (most with the turtle prince), and formulated a new Indian tale type he indexed as AT 441B Ind, "The Despised Animal-Husband". In a later study, he claimed that these stories are "very popular" South Indian tales.

Footnotes

See also
 Tulisa, the Wood-Cutter's Daughter
 The Snake Prince
 Princess Himal and Nagaray
 The Pretty Little Calf (Chinese folktale; prince as bull or calf)

Water animals as husbands:
 Eglė the Queen of Serpents
 The Golden Crab
 The Frog Prince
 Sang Thong (Thai folktale; prince as snail)

References

Indian folklore
Indian fairy tales
Indian literature
Turtles in literature
Fictional princes
Male characters in fairy tales
Female characters in fairy tales
Sri Lankan folklore